Get Over Yourself may refer to:

"Get Over Yourself" (Eden's Crush song)
"Get Over Yourself" (SHeDAISY song)